LSDA may refer to
Learning and Skills Development Agency, UK
Le Seigneur des anneaux, French translation of The Lord of the Rings
Local Spin-Density Approximation 
London School of Dramatic Art
LSDA Northern Ireland